Horace Corner Debenham (24 September 1903 – 16 October 1993) was a British rower. He competed in the men's eight event at the 1924 Summer Olympics.

References

External links
 

1903 births
1993 deaths
British male rowers
Olympic rowers of Great Britain
Rowers at the 1924 Summer Olympics
People from Presteigne
Sportspeople from Powys